Michael Ray Roach (born April 29, 1988) is an American country music singer and songwriter. He is signed to Warner Music Nashville. He has released two albums for the label: Michael Ray and Amos.

Biography
Ray was born in Eustis, Florida. He was inspired by his grandfather Amos "Wilson" Roach, who played music for him and taught him how to play guitar, in addition to having him perform at assisted living centers. Ray chose to form a band in southern Florida after graduating high school, and a disc jockey at WPCV began playing his music. He independently released an album in 2010, which was discovered by manager Tony Conway.

Ray was mentored by John Rich of Big & Rich on the singing competition The Next: Fame Is at Your Doorstep, which he won. He and Rich co-wrote Big & Rich's 2015 single, "Run Away with You". After winning the competition, Ray was signed to Warner Bros. Records Nashville. His first EP, Tour Bootleg, was released in 2014. Two of the EP's tracks, "Kiss You in the Morning" (which went to number one on the Country Airplay charts in 2015) and "Think a Little Less," would later appear on his self-titled second album, released in 2015, becoming Ray's first and third singles, respectively. The track "Real Men Love Jesus" was named as Ray's second single. Ray supported the album with a tour.

On June 16, 2017, Ray released the single "Get to You" ahead of his third studio album, Amos. Upon the album's release in 2018, it would produce two more singles: "One That Got Away" and "Her World or Mine." Both of his albums were produced by Scott Hendricks.

In September 2020, Ray released the single "Whiskey and Rain" ahead of his fourth studio album, originally set to be released in 2021.

Personal life
Michael Ray has one sister and two half sisters.

On July 19, 2018, Ray confirmed that he had begun dating country singer Carly Pearce. They became engaged on December 19, 2018. The two were married on October 6, 2019 near Nashville, Tennessee. In June 2020, Pearce filed for divorce from Ray after eight months of marriage.

Discography

Studio albums

Extended plays

Singles

Notes

Other charted songs

Music videos

Awards and nominations

References

External links
 
 Michael Ray at Warner Music Nashville
 Michael Ray in Heartlandia - on CarbonTV

American country singer-songwriters
American male singer-songwriters
Living people
People from Eustis, Florida
Singing talent show winners
Warner Records artists
Singer-songwriters from Florida
1988 births
21st-century American singers
Country musicians from Florida
21st-century American male singers